The 2011 Dunlop World Challenge was a professional tennis tournament played on carpet courts. It was the fourth edition of the tournament which was part of the 2011 ATP Challenger Tour and the 2011 ITF Women's Circuit. It took place in Toyota, Japan between 21 and 27 November 2011.

ATP entrants

Seeds

 1 Rankings are as of November 14, 2011.

Other entrants
The following players received wildcards into the singles main draw:
  Takeshi Endo
  Takuto Niki
  Arata Onozawa
  Shota Tagawa

The following players received entry from the qualifying draw:
  Gao Wan
  Lee Jea-moon
  Masatoshi Miyazaki
  Wang Chieh-fu

WTA entrants

Seeds

 1 Rankings are as of November 14, 2011.

Other entrants
The following players received wildcards into the singles main draw:
  Kanae Hisami
  Ksenia Lykina
  Makoto Ninomiya
  Mari Tanaka

The following players received entry from the qualifying draw:
  Chan Chin-wei
  Yuka Higuchi
  Nudnida Luangnam
  Ayumi Oka

The following players received entry by a lucky loser spot:
  Shuko Aoyama

Champions

Men's singles

 Tatsuma Ito def.  Sebastian Rieschick, 6–4, 6–2

Women's singles

 Tamarine Tanasugarn def.  Kimiko Date-Krumm, 6–2, 7–5

Men's doubles

 Hiroki Kondo /  Yi Chu-huan vs.  Gao Peng /  Gao Wan, 6–4, 6–1

Women's doubles

 Makoto Ninomiya /  Riko Sawayanagi def.  Caroline Garcia /  Michaëlla Krajicek, Walkover

External links
Official Website
Men's ITF Search
Women's ITF Search 
ATP official site